Birmingham Arena may refer to one of the following arenas:

United Kingdom:

Utilita Arena Birmingham in Birmingham, England, formerly the National Indoor Arena
Resorts World Arena in Birmingham, England, formerly the NEC Arena

United States:

Legacy Arena, in Birmingham, Alabama